"Caraluna" is a song written by Jorge Villamizar and performed by Bacilos. The song is the first single of the album Caraluna and was nominated in 2003 for a Latin Grammy Award for Song of the Year.

Chart performance

References 

2002 songs
Bacilos songs
Songs written by Jorge Villamizar
Spanish-language songs
2002 singles